The Molėtai District Municipality is one of 60 municipalities in Lithuania.

Molėtai is known for its many lakes. There are about 220 lakes in the district and they cover about 7% of the total territory. Since it is only about 60 km north of Vilnius, many Vilnians own summer homes there. The area offers many recreational opportunities. It is easy to reach Molėtai because there is a highway connecting Vilnius and Utena which divides the district into two almost equal parts. Since there is little industry, the district is proud of its lack of pollution. The land is not very fertile, therefore the district's government is focused on developing tourism.

Another natural resource of the district are its forests which cover about 26.6% of its territory.

Structure 
District structure:   
 1 city – Molėtai;
 5 towns – Alanta, Balninkai, Dubingiai, Giedraičiai and Joniškis;
 928 villages.
  
Population of largest Molėtai District Municipality elderships (2011): 
 Molėtai – 6434
 Giedraičiai – 684
 Naujasodis – 496
 Suginčiai – 426
 Toliejai – 379
 Videniškiai – 368
 Alanta – 348
 Balninkai – 319
 Joniškis – 258
 Inturkė – 237

Nature and geography

References

 
Municipalities of Utena County
Municipalities of Lithuania